This is a list of people associated with University College London, including notable staff and alumni associated with the institution.

Founders and supporters

Founders 

Apart from Jeremy Bentham, all these men were named (in Latin) on the Foundation Stone.
 James Abercromby, 1st Baron Dunfermline (1776–1858), Scottish peer and British statesman
 Prince Augustus Frederick, Duke of Sussex (1773–1843), Grand Master of English Freemasons (the United Grand Lodge of England), 1813–1843, supporter of UCL; he laid the foundation stone of the new university on 30 April 1827
 Alexander Baring, 1st Baron Ashburton (1774–1848), British politician and financier
 Jeremy Bentham (1748–1832), English philosopher; a leading advocate for the foundation of UCL
 George Birkbeck (1776–1841), British Quaker, doctor, academic, philanthropist, and early *pioneer in adult education; founder of Birkbeck College.
 Henry Brougham, 1st Baron Brougham and Vaux (1778–1868), Scottish-born British statesman and slavery abolitionist, leading advocate in Parliament for the foundation of UCL
 Thomas Campbell (1777–1844), Scottish poet, founding father of UCL
 Francis Augustus Cox (1783–1853), Baptist Minister, active supporter of the foundation of UCL
 George Eden, 1st Earl of Auckland, British statesman
 Sir Isaac Lyon Goldsmid (1778–1859), financier, promoter of UK Jewry's emancipation; advocate for the foundation of UCL and a very generous benefactor
 Olinthus Gregory (1774–1841), English mathematician, author and editor
 George Grote (1794–1871), English classical historian
 Henry Howard, 13th Duke of Norfolk (1791–1856), Catholic peer, and advocate for the foundation of UCL
 Joseph Hume (1777–1855), Scottish doctor and politician
Zachary Macaulay (1768–1838), Scottish-born slavery abolitionist, Governor of Sierra Leone, and active supporter of the foundation of UCL
 Sir James Mackintosh (1765–1832), Scottish jurist, politician and historian
 James Mill (1773–1836), Scottish historian, economist, political theorist, and philosopher; advocate for the foundation of UCL
 John Russell, 1st Earl Russell (1792–1878), British statesman
 Henry Warburton (1784–1858), English merchant and politician, and also an enthusiastic amateur scientist
 John Ward, 1st Earl of Dudley (1781–1833), British statesman
 William Wilkins (1778–1839), original architect of the main campus
 Thomas Wilson (1764–1843), Congregationalist benefactor of chapels and educational institutions, founder member of the UCL Council from 1825.

A translation of the Latin text engraved on a metal plate that was buried with the foundation stone reads as follows:
To God's favour the greatest and best, eternal architect of the
universe may it bring you happiness and good fortune at the beginning of the eighth year of the reign of King George IV of Britain the most highest prince Augustus Frederick Duke of Sussex patron of all the fine arts the oldest order of architecture the highest among the English the foundation stone of the London University between city state [i.e. citizens] and brothers standing around will be placed by his hand to applause.

Day before the day before the Kalends of May

The work of God desired by the most fortunate citizens of this town has begun at last in the year of human greeting 1827 and in the year of light 5827.

In the name of these most illustrious men who are present and with the guidance of Henry Duke of Norfolk, Henry Marquis of Lansdown, Lord John Russell, John, Viscount Dudley and Ward, George, Baron Auckland, the Hon. James Abercrombie and Sir James Macintosh, Alexander Baring, Henry Bougham, Isaac Lyon Goldsmid, George Grote, Zachary Macaulay, Benjamin Shaw, William Tooke, Henry Waymouth, George Birkbeck, Thomas Campbell,
Olinthus Gregory, Joseph Hume, James Mill, John Smith, Henry Warburton, John Wishaw, Thomas Wilson, and William Wilkins, architect.

Supporters

Benefactors
 Sir Herbert Bartlett (1842–1921), civil engineer, enabled the establishment of the UCL Bartlett School of Architecture
 Sir Isaac Lyon Goldsmid (1778–1859), financier, promoter of UK Jewry's emancipation; advocate for the foundation of UCL and a very generous benefactor

Council members 
 Timothy Clement-Jones, Baron Clement-Jones, (1949–)
 Shreela Flather, Baroness Flather (1934–), British politician, UCL alumna, and the first South Asian woman to receive a peerage
 Sir Stephen Wall, British diplomat, leading Catholic layman, chairman of Council (2008–)
 Thomas Wilson (1764–1843), Congregationalist benefactor of chapels and educational institutions, founder member of the UCL Council from 1825.
 Thomas Field Gibson (1803-1889), Manufacturer and benefactor – on Council 1851–68
 Harry Woolf, Baron Woolf, UCL alumnus; variously Visitor, Deputy Chairman and Chairman of the Council (2005–08), and Chairman of the UCL Institute of Advanced Legal Studies.

Nobel laureates

Fields Medallists
The Fields Medal is often described as the "Nobel Prize in Mathematics". The UCL mathematical community has produced three Fields Medallists,
 
1998: Timothy Gowers
Faculty member of the Department of Mathematics (1991–1995)
1970: Alan Baker
BSc (1961), Professor (1964–1965)
1958: Klaus Roth
MSc (1948), PhD (1950), Professor (1948–1966)

Former staff

Art, architecture, and design 
 Dame Phyllida Barlow, Sculptor 
 Tancred Borenius (1885–1948), art historian, diplomat and British wartime spy
 Sir Peter Cook (1936–), architect, The Bartlett Professor of Architecture
 Stuart Brisley, performance artist
 Thorold Dickinson (1903–84), film maker; Britain's first Professor of Film Studies
 Thomas Leverton Donaldson (1795–1885), architect, first UCL Professor of Architecture
 Lucian Freud (1922–2011), painter
 Roger Fry (1866–1934), painter, art critic
 John Hooper Harvey (1911–97), architectural historian, Bartlett School of Architecture, 1950–59.
 Tim Head, artist
 John Hilliard, artist
 Otto Königsberger (1908–1999), architect
 Michael (Edward) Parsons (1938–), avant-garde composer, and lecturer in fine art
 Cameron Sinclair (1973–), co-founder of Architecture for Humanity

Engineering sciences 
 Eric Ash (1928-2021), Head of Department of Electronic and Electrical Engineering , Pender Chair from 1979 to 1986
 Harold Barlow, staff then Pender Chair in the Department of Electronic and Electrical Engineering (1950–1966)
 Thomas Hudson Beare (1859–1940), chair of engineering from 1889 to 1901
 Henry Chilver, Baron Chilver of Cranfield (1926–), 1961–69
 Wellesley Curram Clinton (1871-1934), Pender Chair from 1926 to 1934
 Jon Crowcroft, Professor of Networked Systems in Computer Science
 Alexander Lamb Cullen, Head of Department of Electronic and Electrical Engineering, Pender Chair from 1967 to 1980
 Sir David Davies, Head of the Department of Electronic and Electrical Engineering (1985–1988)
 John William Draper - pioneer astro-photographer who also took the oldest surviving picture of a woman
 Anthony Finkelstein, Head of Computer Science and Dean of the UCL Faculty of Engineering Sciences until 2015
 John Fleming (1849–1945)
 William Edward Gibbs (1890-1934), Ramsay Memorial Professor of Chemical Engineering
 Eaton Hodgkinson, Professor of the mechanical principles of engineering (appointed in 1847)
 Reginald Otto Kapp (1885-1966), Head of Department of Electronic and Electrical Engineering , Pender Chair from 1935 to 1945
 Peter T. Kirstein (1933-2020), Head of Computer Science department from 1980 to 1994
 John Edwin Midwinter (1938-2021), Pender Professor of Electronic Engineering from 1991 to 2004, Vice Provost from 1994-1999
 John Millington (1779-1868), the UK's first Civil Engineering Professor, appointed in 1827
 Sir John O'Reilly, Head of the Department of Electronic and Electrical Engineering (1997–2001)
 William Pole (1813–1900), 1859–76
 William Ramsay (1852-1916), Chair of Chemistry (appointed 1887)
 H. E. Watson (1886-1980), Ramsay Memorial Professor of Chemical Engineering
 E. C. Williams, first Ramsay Memorial Professor of Chemical Engineering (1923-1927)

Languages and literature
 Chimen Abramsky – Emeritus Professor of Hebrew and Jewish Studies
 Celia Britton – Emeritus Professor of French
 A. S. Byatt – Senior Lecturer in English and American Literature (1972–83); winner of the 1990 Booker Prize
 Sir Hermann Gollancz – Professor of Hebrew; British Rabbi (1902–24)
 Alan Hollinghurst – Lecturer in English; deputy editor, The Times Literary Supplement; later winner of the 2004 Booker Prize
 A. E. Housman – Professor of Latin; poet most famous as author of A Shropshire Lad
 Dan Jacobson – Professor of English; author; winner of the prestigious Somerset Maugham Award
 Sir Frank Kermode – Lord Northcliffe Professor of Modern English Literature (1967–74); literary critic
 Tomáš Masaryk – Inaugurated the London School of Slavonic and East European Studies (SSEES), now part of UCL; later became the first President of Czechoslovakia
 David Masson – Professor of English Literature; Scottish writer
 Karl Miller – Lord Northcliffe Professor of English Literature (1976–92); first editor, The London Review of Books
 Arnaldo Momigliano – Professor of History (1951–75)
 Henry Morley – Professor of English Literature
 Dadabhai Naoroji – Professor of Gujarati (1856–1865) credited as the first British Asian UK Member of Parliament, also known as the "Grand Old Man of India"
 Sir Anthony Panizzi – Professor of Italian
 Stephen Spender – Lecturer in English; Gresham Professor of Rhetoric; English poet
 John Sutherland – Emeritus Lord Northcliffe Professor of Modern English Literature; columnist for The Guardian
 Jeremy Treglown – Professor of English; editor, The Times Literary Supplement; author
 D. P. Walker – Reader in French, musicologist, composer (1945–61)
 Stanley Wells – Emeritus Professor of Shakespeare Studies, Chairman of the Shakespeare Birthplace Trust
 Moira Yip – Professor of Linguistics

Law

Mathematical, physical, and space sciences 

 Jim Al-Khalili – post-doctoral Fellow
 Alan Baker, (mathematics) – winner of the 1970 Fields Medal
 Charles Bungay Fawcett – Professor of Geography
 Jocelyn Burnell, (astronomy) – discovered radio pulsars
 Paul Cohn – Astor Professor of Mathematics
 Marianna Csörnyei – Professor of Mathematics
 Harold Davenport – Astor Professor of Mathematics, number theory
 Philip Dawid – Professor of Statistics, President of the International Society for Bayesian Analysis
 Augustus DeMorgan – Professor of Mathematics, noted for his law of sets
 Sir Francis Galton – 'Father of fingerprinting'
 Tim Gowers – Professor of Mathematics; winner of the 1998 Fields Medal
 Peter Higgs – Theoretical Physicist and winner of the 2004 Wolf Prize in Physics
 James Joseph Sylvester – Professor of Mathematics, algebra and matrix theory
 Norman Lloyd Johnson – Reader in Statistics
 Sir James Lighthill – Lecturer; predecessor to Stephen Hawking as Lucasian Professor of Mathematics at Cambridge University
 Dennis Lindley, statistician
 Sir Harrie Massey – Goldsmid Professor of Applied Mathematics, world expert on atomic and molecular collisions
 Egon Pearson – Professor of Statistics
 Karl Pearson – Goldsmid Professor of Applied Mathematics; founder of the Department of Applied Statistics
 Eugene Rabinowitch – worked in the Manhattan Project and co-founded the Bulletin of the Atomic Scientists
 Klaus F. Roth – Professor of Mathematics, winner of the 1958 Fields Medal
 Edward Teller – 'Father of the Hydrogen Bomb'
 Patrick du Val
 Alfred North Whitehead – Professor of Physics

Life sciences 

 Sir Thomas Barlow, royal physician known for his research on infantile scurvy (Barlow's disease)
 Dame Carol Black, Professor of Rheumatology; National Director for Health & Work; formerly president of the Royal College of Physicians
 Patricia H. Clarke née Greene, FRS, (1919–2010), Professor of Microbial Biochemistry
 David Clary, FRS, Director of the UCL Centre for Theoretical and Computational Chemistry; Chief Scientific Advisor, UK Foreign and Commonwealth Office, 2009-
 Alex Comfort, Faculty of Medicine; author of the seminal sex guide, The Joy of Sex
 George Viner Ellis, prominent anatomist. He studied Medicine at UCL Medical School and later became a Professor of Anatomy
 Sir Martin Evans, Nobel Prize in Physiology or Medicine-winning biologist for his work with stem cells
 Lesley Fallowfield, Professor of Psycho-Oncology (1997–2001)
 Suzi Gage, psychologist, science blogger 
 C. Robin Ganellin, Emeritus Professor of Medicinal Chemistry, co-discoverer of cimetidine
 Andrew J Goldberg, Clinical Senior Lecturer in orthopaedic surgery
 J. B. S. Haldane, Professor of Genetics (1933–57). He was one of the founders of population genetics
 Archibald Hill, Professor of Physiology (1922-51), winner of the 1922 Nobel Prize in Physiology or Medicine
 Victor Horsley, Professor of Clinical Surgery co-inventor of Horsley–Clarke apparatus
 Ian Jacobs, Dean of Medicine
 Roland Levinsky, Hugh Greenwood Professor of Immunology.
 Avrion Mitchison, Professor of Zoology
 Santa Ono, GlaxoSmithKline Professor of Biomedical Sciences
 Richard Quain, Chair of Anatomy (?–1850), having also studied Medicine at UCL Medical School, and later physician-extraordinary to Queen Victoria
 Dunkinfield Henry Scott, Botanist
 Anthony Segal, Professor of Medicine
 John Maynard-Smith, Lecturer in Zoology (1952–65)
 David Morley, Professor of child health, a pioneer in child healthcare
 Bert Sakmann, Nobel Prize-winning cell physiologist and former researcher at UCL Department of Biophysics (1970–1973)
 Sir Edward Henry Sieveking, former Physician Extraordinary to King Edward VII
 Charles Spearman, Professor of Psychology; noted for Spearman's rank correlation coefficient
 Bernard Spilsbury, Britain's first forensic scientist.
 Ernest Starling, Physiologist, noted for the Frank–Starling law of the heart, producing the Starling equation, and for the discovery of hormones at UCL alongside his brother-in-law William Bayliss
 Patrick Wall, Professor of Neurophysiology, noted for the influential gate theory of pain with Ronald Melzack at McGill University
 David J Werring, Professor of Clinical Neurology, noted for influential research in stroke
 Alexander Williamson – noted for the chemical synthesis of ether
 Lewis Wolpert, Professor of Biology
 John (J-Z)Young, Professor of Anatomy

Philosophy 
 A. J. Ayer, Grote Professor of the Philosophy of Mind and Logic (1946–59)
 Myles Burnyeat, Lecturer in Philosophy
 Gerald Cohen, Reader in Philosophy; later Chichele Professor of Social and Political Theory at Oxford University
 S.V. Keeling, Lecturer and Reader in Philosophy, scholar of J. M. E. McTaggart and Descartes (after whom the annual Keeling lectures on Ancient Philosophy at UCL are named).
 Stuart Hampshire, Grote Professor of the Philosophy of Mind and Logic
 W. D. Hart
 Ted Honderich, Emeritus Grote Professor of the Philosophy of Mind and Logic
 John Macmurray, Grote Professor of the Philosophy of Mind and Logic; BBC broadcaster
 John Stuart Mill, studied with John Austin at UCL.
 Carveth Read, Professor of Moral Philosophy
 Bernard Williams, Lecturer in Philosophy; later Knightbridge Professor of Philosophy at Cambridge University
 Richard Wollheim, Grote Professor of the Philosophy of Mind and Logic

Social sciences, geography, and history 
 Michael Crawford, Professor of Ancient History
 Wendy Davies, Professor of Medieval Celtic History
 Romesh Chunder Dutt (রমেশচন্দ্র দত্ত)), student and later Professor of Indian History who translated the Ramayana and Mahabharata. He served as President of the Indian National Congress in 1899.
 G. E. M. de Ste. Croix, Marxist historian of Greek Antiquity, author of The Class Struggle in the Ancient Greek World
Sir Andrew Dilnot, Economist; Principal, St. Hugh's College Oxford; Pro Vice-Chancellor, Oxford
 Dame Mary Douglas, Professor of Anthropology; noted for her Cultural Theory of Risk
 Hugh Gaitskell, lecturer in Political Economy (1928–1939), former leader of the Labour Party
 Georgina Herrmann, Reader in the Archaeology of Western Asia (1994-2002)
 Albert Pollard, Professor of Constitutional History; major contributor to the Dictionary of National Biography
 Conrad Russell, Professor of Early Modern British History
 Sir Eric Turner, Professor of Papyrology
 Paul Rosenstein-Rodan, taught Economics at UCL, authored the "Big Push" Theory, later Assistant Director of the Economic Department in the International Bank for Reconstruction and Development, 1947-1953.

Current staff
For the main listing see

Art, architecture, and design
 Kate Bright
 David Burrows
 Susan Alexis Collins
 Melanie Counsell
 Peter Davies
 Benedict Drew
 Simon Faithfull
 Lilah Fowler
 Judith Goddard
 Larne Abse Gogarty
 Dryden Goodwin
 Graham Gussin
 Nadia Hebson
 Holly Hendry
 Kristen Kreider
 Brighid Lowe
 Alastair Mackinven
 Onya McCausland
 Lisa Milroy
 Katrina Palmer
 Jayne Parker
 Sarah Pickering
 Liz Rideal
 Karin Ruggaber
 Joy Sleeman
 Andrew Stahl
 Gary Stevens
 Jack Strange
 Estelle Thompson
 Jon Thomson
 Phoebe Unwin
 Jo Volley
 Carey Young

Engineering sciences 

Polina Bayvel, Professor of Optical Communications & Networks
Ann Blandford, Professor of Human-Computer Interaction
Helen Czerski, Research Fellow in Mechanical Engineering
George Danezis, Professor of Security and Privacy Engineering
Mark Handley, Professor of Networked Systems, Computer Science
Zoe Laughlin, Materials Engineer and co-founder of the Institute of Making
Paola Lettieri, Professor of Chemical Engineering, Director of UCL East
Mark Miodownik, Professor of Materials & Society, co-founder of the Institute of Making
Peter O'Hearn, Professor of Computer Science
Michael Pepper, Pender Chair of Nanoelectronics (2009-)
Yvonne Rogers, Professor of Interaction Design and director of UCLIC
Angela Sasse, Professor of Human-Centred Technology
John Shawe-Taylor, Director of the Centre for Computational Statistics
Rebecca Shipley, Professor of Healthcare Engineering
David Silver, Professor of Computer Science
Eva Sorensen, 11th Ramsay Memorial Professor of Chemical Engineering
Sarah Spurgeon, Head of Department of Electronic and Electrical Engineering
Jose L. Torero, Head of the Department of Civil, Environmental and Geomatic Engineering

History, languages and literature

 Rosemary Ashton, OBE, Quain Professor of English Language and Literature
 John Dickie, Professor in Italian Studies
 Mark Ford, Professor of English
 Mary Fulbrook, Professor of German History
 Philip Horne, Professor of English
 John Mullan, Professor of English
 Li Wei, Chair of Applied Linguistics and Director of the UCL Centre for Applied Linguistics

Mathematical, physical and space sciences 
 Tim Broyd, Professor of Built Environment Foresight and Honorary Professor of Civil Engineering
 Alan Sokal, Professor of Mathematics

Life sciences 
 Peter Butler, Professor of Surgery
 David Colquhoun, notable for predicting the single Ion channel function, later verified by Bert Sakmann
 Martin Elliott, Professor of Paediatric Cardiothoracic Surgery
 Rob Horne, Professor of Behavioural Medicine, School of Pharmacy
 Steve Jones, Professor of Genetics
 Nick Lane, Winner of the 2015 biochemical society award and influential science writer
 Sammy Lee, expert in in vitro fertilisation
 John O'Keefe (neuroscientist), winner of the 2014 Nobel Prize in Physiology or Medicine
 Janet Radcliffe-Richards, Director, Centre for Biomedical Ethics and Philosophy
 Martin Raff, Professor of Zoology, Former Director of the Laboratory of Molecular Cell Biology
 Sarah Tabrizi, Professor of Neuroscience
 Robin Weiss, Director of the Wohl Virus Research Centre, discovered that CD4 is the co-receptor for HIV
 Semir Zeki, Professor of Neurology, proponent for the role of Visual area 4 in cognitive colour construction

Social sciences, geography, and history
 John Adams, Professor of geography and authority on risk compensation
 Richard Blundell, Ricardo Professor of Political Economy; Director, Institute for Fiscal Studies
 Catherine Hall, Professor of Modern British Social and Cultural History
 Gordon Hillman, Honorary Visiting Professor in Archaeobotany (Palaeoethnobotany)
 Simon Hornblower, Grote Professor of ancient history and editor of the Oxford Classical Dictionary
 Amélie Kuhrt, Historian of the ancient Near East.
 Martyn Rady, Professor of Central European History
 John Reid, Chairman of the Institute for Security and Resilience Studies at UCL, and a member of the UK Parliament.
 Christopher Tilley, Professor of Anthropology and Archaeology, he is known as one of the pioneers of the post-processual archaeology movement.

Alumni

Academics 

 Roy Clive Abraham (Certificate in Anthropology, 1927), scholar of African languages
 Israel Abrahams (MA), Jewish scholar
 Sir Walter Adams (History and later lecturer), historian and former Director of the London School of Economics
 Hutton Ayikwei Addy, Professor of Public Health, first dean of the University for Development Studies Medical School 
 Momtazuddin Ahmed (PhD Philosophy, 1937), Bangladeshi philosopher and academic
 Mark Allinson (PhD in German history), academic and historian of German history
 Ali Ansari (BA), historian and founder of the Institute for Iranian Studies
 Emmanuel Quaye Archampong, Emeritus Professor of Surgery at the University of Ghana
 Robert Arnott, medical archaeologist
 John Baker, UCL (LLB, PhD): Downing Professor of the Laws of England, University of Cambridge
 Trevor J. Barnes, Professor of Economic Geography at the University of British Columbia
 Peter Birks, former Regius Professor of Civil Law, University of Oxford
 Edith Clara Batho (English, 1915), Principal of Royal Holloway College
 Bernard Crick, British political theorist
 David Crystal, Professor Emeritus, UWB, prominent linguist
 Stephen Daniels (PhD), Professor of Cultural Geography at University of Nottingham
 Stephen Guest, Professor of Legal Philosophy, UCL
 Noreena Hertz, associate director, Judge Business School at Cambridge University
 David Gwilym James, Vice-Chancellor 1952-1965 University of Southampton
 Eleanor Janega (PhD), American mediaeval historian, author and broadcaster
 William Jevons, Professor of Political Economy, UCL
Timothy L. Killeen (BSc, PhD), President of the University of Illinois system
 R.J.B. Knight, naval historian
 Victoria Lemieux, Associate Professor at University of British Columbia
 David Llewellyn, Vice-Chancellor of Harper Adams University
 Julie Maxton, Registrar at Oxford University
 Lillian Penson, first woman Vice-Chancellor of London University
 Chung-Kwong Poon (潘宗光), GBS, JP, President of The Hong Kong Polytechnic University since 1991
 Henry Enfield Roscoe, former Vice-Chancellor of the University of London (1896-1902)
 Lord Randolph Quirk, Quain Professor of English Literature
 Stefan Reif, studentship, later Professor of Hebrew at the University of Cambridge
 William Scoresby Routledge (Medicine), ethnographer
 Sir Adrian Smith (UCL Mathematics, PhD), FRS,  Vice-Chancellor of the University of London, 2012-
 Jonathan Wolff (MPhil), Professor of Philosophy and Dean of the Faculty of Arts and Humanities at UCL

Economists
 Edith Abbott (Carnegie Scholarship), American economist, social reformer, academic and author. Abbott was the first women to become a Dean of an American Graduate School at the University of Chicago.
 Sophia N. Antonopoulou (PhD Economics), economist and academic
 Süleyman Başak (BSc Civil Engineering), financial economist
 Roger Bate, economist formerly of the Institute of Economic Affairs and other free market-orientated organisations
 John Stuart Mill attended UCL to study with John Austin, major political philosopher.
 Philip Wicksteed, economist and theologian

Engineers
 William Edward Ayrton, co-developer the first spiral-spring ammeter, wattmeter and electric tricycle
 Harold Barlow, engineer and UCL academic
 Arnold Beck, Professor of Engineering, University of Cambridge
 Ian McDonald Campbell, civil engineer and vice-chairman of British Rail
 Colin Chapman, Formula One designer and founder of Lotus Cars
 Demetrius Comino OBE, engineer, inventor of Dexion steel slotted angle system
 Edward Dobson (1816/17?–1908), Provincial Engineer for the Canterbury Province in New Zealand
 John Ambrose Fleming, inventor of the thermionic valve and the diode
 Oliver Lodge, involved in the development of wireless telegraph
 Colin Robbins, software engineer, co-inventor of LDAP
 Bruce Woodgate, Principal investigator and designer of the Space Telescope Imaging Spectrograph on the Hubble Space Telescope

Life scientists
 Agnes Arber (BSc, DSc, 1905), botanist
 Alec Bangham (Medicine), biophysicist researching liposomes and inventing clinically-useful artificial lung surfactants
 Anne Beloff-Chain, biochemist
Margaret Jane Benson, (1859-1936) paleobotanist
 Alfred William Bennett (1833–1902), British botanist and publisher of The Friend
 Katie Bentley, computer scientist, builds computational software to understand communication between cells
 G. Marius Clore FRS (Biochemistry, UCL, 1976; Medicine, University College Medical School, 1979), biophysicist and structural biologist; pioneer of multidimensional macromolecular NMR spectroscopy laying foundations of 3D structure determination of proteins in solution; member of the United States National Academy of Sciences
 Sir Philip Cohen (BSc, PhD, 1969), Royal Medal-winning biochemist
 Gillian Griffiths, cell biologist and immunologist
 Allan Octavian Hume (Medicine), political reformer, ornithologist and botanist, one of the founders of the Indian National Congress
 John Maynard-Smith, theoretical evolutionary biologist and geneticist
 Ralph Kekwick, biochemist
 Raphael Weldon (Medicine, left 1877), evolutionary biologist and a founder of biometry

Mathematicians, scientists and statisticians 

 Alan Baker, winner of the 1970 Fields Medal
 D.J. Bartholomew (BSc, PhD Mathematics), statistician and President of the Royal Statistical Society (1993-1995)
 Laurence Baxter, professor of statistics 
 Alexander Graham Bell, inventor of telephone
 Sir Jagadish Chandra Bose – one of the founders of radio telecommunication.
 George E. P. Box (1919–2013), (UCL Mathematics and Statistics, PhD, 1953), Vilas Research Professor of Statistics, University of Wisconsin–Madison
 Margaret Burbidge, astrophysicist, former American Astronomical Society President, former Royal Greenwich Observatory Director
 Ian Crawford – Professor of Planetary Science and Astrobiology, Birkbeck University of London
 Florence Nightingale David (1909–1993), statistician
 Roland Dobbs, physicist
 Thomas Eckersley, theoretical physicist and expert in radio waves
 Thomas Elger, selenographer famous for his lunar map
 John Fox, statistician
 Cecilie French, chemist specialising in magnetochemistry.
 William Gowers, winner of the 1998 Fields Medal
 Cyril Hilsum, pioneer of liquid crystal materials and devices, development of flat screen devices
 Hermann Arthur Jahn, chemist, with Edward Teller he identified the Jahn–Teller effect
 William Stanley Jevons, economist and logician
 Norman Lloyd Johnson, professor of statistics and author
 Charles K. Kao, physicist, father of fiber optic communications and broadband, winner of the 2009 Nobel Prize in Physics
 Chris Lintott, Professor of Astrophysics at Oxford
 Kathleen Lonsdale, discovered the structure of benzene
 Karl Pearson, statistician, founder of statistics department at UCL.
 Sir Roger Penrose, mathematician and Emeritus Rouse Ball Professor of Mathematics at Oxford, winner of the 2020 Nobel Prize in Physics
 Suzanna Randall, astrophysicist and private astronaut candidate
 Hans Reck, volcanologist and paleontologist
 Owen Willans Richardson, physicist, winner of the 1928 Nobel Prize in Physics
 Klaus Roth, mathematician, winner of the 1958 Fields Medal
 Walter Rouse-Ball, mathematician

 R.J.G. Savage (PhD Paleontology), palaeontologist known as Britain's leading expert on fossil mammals
 M. J. Seaton, British mathematician, atomic physicist and astronomer
 Ian Sloan, Australian applied mathematician
 Kirstine Smith, statistician, creator of optimal design of experiments
 David Spiegelhalter, statistician, Professor at Cambridge
 Russell Stannard, Professor Emeritus of Physics at the Open University, winner of the 1999 Bragg Medal
 Tan Tin Wee (陈定炜), Singaporean scientist, 2012 Inaugural Internet Hall of Fame, inventor of Internationalized Domain Names (IDN) (1998), bioinformatics pioneer in Asia, Director, National Supercomputing Centre Singapore.
 Percy White (Chemical Engineering), British chemist and nuclear scientist
 Heinz Wolff,  scientist, television and radio presenter
 Jerzy Neyman, Polish mathematician and statistician that first introduced the modern concept of a confidence interval into statistical hypothesis testing and co-revised Ronald Fisher's null hypothesis testing

Medical figures 
 Sir (Ernest) Donald Acheson, Chief Medical Officer and Chief Medical Adviser to H.M. Government 1983–91.
 Judy Armitage (PhD, 1976), professor of molecular and cellular biochemistry at the University of Oxford
 Tipu Aziz (Neurophysiology), professor of neurosurgery and neurophysiology
 Alan Baddeley, psychologist known for his work on working memory, including his multiple components model
 Edward Ballard (Medicine), physician and social commentator on living conditions in Victorian Britain
 Erasmus Darwin Barlow, psychiatrist, physiologist and businessman
 Sir Thomas Barlow (Medicine), British royal physician known for his research on infantile scurvy (Barlow's disease)
 Dame Josephine Barnes (Medicine), obstetrician and gynaecologist
 Ann Barrett, Emeritus Professor of Oncology at the University of East Anglia
 Allon Barsam, ophthalmologist and medical researcher, who pioneered the use of microwave keratoplasty in humans
 Herbert Barrie, neonatologist
 William Bayliss, physiologist who, along with his brother-in-law Ernest Starling, first discovered the existence and function of hormones while working at University College London
 Wilfred Bion, psychoanalyst
 Charles Bolton (MD), physician and pathologist
 John Bowlby (Medicine), psychologist, psychiatrist, pioneer of attachment theory
 Karim Brohi, (BSc computer science,  MB BS medicine),  surgeon, international trauma science expert, and academic
 Michael Brown, Director of Army Medicine and former Physician to the Queen
 Sir Cyril Lodowic Burt FBA (1883-1971). Professor and Chair of Psychology (1931–51), pioneering child psychologist, now discredited.
 Walter Carr (BS MD), physician and surgeon
 William Carpenter, physician, invertebrate zoologist and physiologist
 Dame June Clark Emeritus Professor of Community Nursing, University of Wales, Swansea
 Oscar Clayton, surgeon
 Archie Cochrane, epidemiologist, Professor of Tuberculosis and Chest Diseases, Welsh National School of Medicine, pioneer of evidence-based medicine
 Leslie Collier, virologist who helped to create the first heat stable smallpox vaccine key in the eventual eradication of the disease.
 Edward Treacher Collins, ophthalmologist and first described Treacher Collins Syndrome

 Henry Radcliffe Crocker, dermatologist
 Jane Dacre (Medicine), President of the Royal College of Physicians (2014–incumbent), only the third female President in its nearly 500-year history
 Viscount Bertrand Dawson, doctor to the British Royal Family
 Deborah Doniach, leading expert on auto-immune diseases
 George Viner Ellis (Medicine and later Professor of Anatomy), prominent anatomist
 Sir John Erichsen (Medicine and later lecturer), prominent surgeon and surgeon-extraordinary to Queen Victoria
 Sir Martin Evans (PhD, 1969, and later lecturer), winner of the 2007 Nobel Prize in Physiology or Medicine
 Jeremy Farrar (BSc, MBBS), director of the Wellcome Trust 2014-
 Sir William Henry Flower (MB), comparative anatomist and 2nd director of the Natural History Museum, London
 William Tilbury Fox, dermatologist
 Eva Frommer. Fellow of the Royal College of Psychiatrists, child psychiatrist and pioneer of arts therapies in hospital, for children
 Clare Gerada (Medicine), former Chair of the Royal College of General Practitioners (2010–13), the first female Chair for 50 years
 Ben Goldacre (MB BS), academic and science writer
 Andrew J Goldberg, Clinical Senior Lecturer in orthopaedic surgery and Consultant Orthopaedic Surgeon
 Rainer Guillery, Emeritus Professor of Anatomy, University of Wisconsin Medical School; formerly Dr Lee's Professor of Human Anatomy, University of Oxford
 Anita Harding, neurologist who co-authored the first paper which identified pathogenic mitochondrial DNA mutation in human disease (in Kearn-Sayre syndrome)
John Ivor Pulsford James, known as J.I.P. James, president and honorary fellow of the British Orthopaedic Association
 Donald Jeffries, virologist, expert on HIV
 Sir William Jenner, was the first doctor to identify between typhus and typhoid
 Christian Jessen, medical doctor and television presenter best known Embarrassing Bodies
 Edwin Lankester, founder of the Quarterly Journal of Microscopical Science (QJMS)
 Thomas Lewis (MB BS), cardiologist
 Joseph Lister, 1st Baron Lister, pioneer in the use of antiseptics in surgery
 Kalman Mann (MB BS), Israeli physician, 8th director general of Hadassah Medical Organization 
 Barrie Marmion, microbiologist
 Henry Marsh (Medicine), neurosurgeon
 Clare Marx (MB BS), first female president elected at the Royal College of Surgeons of England (2014-incumbent)
 Jan McLelland, (Medicine), dermatologist and medical researcher
 Max Pemberton, medical doctor, author and journalist
 Raj Persaud, Consultant Psychiatrist in General Adult and Community Psychiatry, Bethlem Royal & Maudsley Teaching Hospitals and Clinical Tutor to Bethlem & Maudsley Senior House Officers, since 1994
 Sir Richard Powell (Medicine), physician and Physician Royal to Queen Victoria, King Edward VII and King George V
 Richard Quain (Medicine, 1840, and later Chair of Anatomy), physician who also served as physician-extraordinary to Queen Victoria
 Cornelius Odarquaye Quarcoopome, Pioneer ophthalmologist in Ghana
 Sir Philip Randle, Professor of Clinical Biochemistry, University of Oxford since 1975
 Bernard Ribeiro, Baron Ribeiro, former President of the Royal College of Surgeons of England (2005–08)
 Sydney Ringer (MB), British clinician, physiologist and pharmacologist, best known for inventing Ringer's solution
 Rosemary Rue, physician and civil servant
 Sir Edward Sharpey-Schafer, physiologist
 Elizabeth Joan Stokes (MB BS), clinical bacteriologist
 Sir Rodney Sweetnam, President, Royal College of Surgeons of England, 1995–98; formerly Orthopaedic Surgeon to The Middlesex and University College Hospitals 1960–92; Orthopaedic Surgeon to The Queen 1982–92.
 Susan Swindells (MB BS), infectious disease expert, AIDS researcher, Scientist Laureate at the University of Nebraska Medical Center, and member of the NIH Covid-19 Treatments Guidelines Panel.
 Hugh Owen Thomas, father of orthopaedic surgery in Britain
 Richard Turner-Warwick, formerly Senior Surgeon and Urologist to The Middlesex and St Peters Hospitals and Hunterian Professor Royal College of Surgeons
 Dame Margaret Turner-Warwick, President, Royal College of Physicians 1989–92
 Kenneth Walton, pathologist
 W. Roger Williams, pathologist, surgeon, cancer researcher and medical writer
 Dame Albertine Winner (BSc, MB BS, MD), physician and medical administrator
 R. A. Young (MB MD), physician and tuberculosis specialist

Architects, artists, and designers 
 Corinne Bennett (Bartlett, 1957), conservation architect
 David Bomberg (1890–1957), Slade School of Fine Art (1913)
 Teresa Borsuk (Bartlett, 1981), architect
 Martin John Callanan
 Sir William Coldstream
 Martin Creed, conceptual artist; winner of the 2001 Turner Prize
 Robert Erskine (Slade 1978) sculptor, designer, automotive broadcaster, winner of the 1994 International Sir Otto Beit Award For Public Sculpture Excellence
James Stevens Curl (History of Art), architectural historian, conservation consultant and critic
 Antony Gormley, sculptor; winner of the 1994 Turner Prize; creator of the Angel of the North
 Eileen Gray (Slade, 1898), lacquer artist and furniture designer
 Gerry Judah (Slade, 1977), artist, sculptor and designer
 Augustus John, painter
 Sir Osbert Lancaster, cartoonist, author, critic
 Gertrude Leverkus (B.A., 1919), architect
 Wyndham Lewis, co-founder of the Vorticist movement
 David Mlinaric, architect, interior designer
 Evelyn De Morgan (Slade, 1877), painter
 Ben Nicholson, abstract painter
 Sir Eduardo Paolozzi, sculptor and artist
 Stuart Pearson Wright, painter
 Monica Pidgeon, interior designer and journalist
 Patricio Pouchulu, architect and academic
 Paula Rego, painter (Slade, 1952–56)
 Jenny Saville, prominent Young British Artist
 Sir Stanley Spencer, painter
 Sir John Summerson, leading British architectural historian and Slade Professor of Fine Art at the University of Oxford (1958–59)
 Tomoko Takahashi, installation artist; shortlisted for the 2000 Turner Prize
 Rachel Whiteread, sculptor; winner of the 1993 Turner Prize
 Sir Rex Whistler, artist, designer and illustrator
 Sir Colin St John Wilson (Architecture, 1949), architect, lecturer and author. He spent over 30 years progressing the project to build a new British Library in London.

Banking, business and commercial figures 

 Andreas Antonopoulos (Computer Science), technology entrepreneur
 Dominic Blakemore (French), CEO of Compass Group
 Richard Brown (MPhil Town and Transport Planning), current Chairman of Eurostar International and former chief executive of Eurostar UK
 Colin Chapman, founder of Lotus Cars
 Paul Donovan, current CEO of Odeon UCI Cinemas Group and former CEO of Vodafone Ireland and eircom
 Lewis Evans, scientific instrument collector and businessman
 Lord Digby Jones (LLB), former Director-General of the Confederation of British Industry and Minister of State for Trade and Investment
 John Kenny, BSc, founder and Chairman, JKX Oil and Gas, since 1992. [1995].
 Ian Luder, Taxation specialist, and Lord Mayor of the City of London 2008–2009
 Roger Lyons, Joint General Secretary, AMICUS since 2001; President, Trades Union Congress, 2003–04. [1996].
 Susan Ma, managing director of Tropic Skin Care; finalist on The Apprentice series seven (2011).
 Richard Martell, Creator of the controversial social network "FitFinder".
 Ceawlin Thynn, Viscount Weymouth, Longleat Enterprises
 Roger Tomlinson, founder of Geographic Information Systems President, Tomlinson Associates Ltd, Consulting Geographers. [2003].
 Marjorie Wallace, Countess Skarbek, Chief Executive, SANE, since 1990. [2004].
 Edwin Waterhouse, founding partner of PricewaterhouseCoopers
 Dame Sharon White, Chairman of the John Lewis Partnership; former Chief Executive of Ofcom
 Farhad Moshiri, billionaire and stakeholder in Everton F.C.

Charity sector figures
 Baroness Delyth Morgan (Physiology), Chief Executive of Breakthrough Breast Cancer and former UK government minister
 Jeremy Farrar (University College Medical School, 1986), Director of the Wellcome Institute, 2014-

Government and public officials, heads of state and politicians 
UCL has had a long and distinguished history in producing many prominent politicians for countries home and abroad. Notable alumni include the "Father of the Nation" of each of India, Kenya and Mauritius, the founders of Ghana, modern Japan and Nigeria among others.

Heads of state and intergovernmental organisations
Nicos Anastasiades (Shipping Law), current President of Cyprus (2013-)
 Sir Abubakar Tafawa Balewa, first Prime Minister of Nigeria (1960-1966)
 Sir Elliott Belgrave (LLB), former Governor-General of Barbados (2012-2017) 
 Martin Bourke (BA, 1969), Governor of the Turks and Caicos Islands (1993-1996)
 Angie Brooks (International Law, 1953), first African woman President of the United Nations General Assembly (24th Session, 1969-1970) and the second woman to head the United Nations
 Terry Davis (LLB, 1962), former Secretary General of the Council of Europe (2004-2009)
 Sir Ellis Clarke (LLB), Governor-General then first President of Trinidad and Tobago (1972-1987)
 Robert Fico (postgraduate studies at SSEES), Prime Minister of Slovakia (2006-2010, 2012-2018) 
 Sir Vincent Floissac (LLB),  Governor-General of Saint Lucia (1987-1988)
 Chaim Herzog (חיים הרצוג) (LLB), sixth President of Israel (1983-1993)
 Hirobumi Itō (伊藤 博文) (one of the "Chōshū Five"), first Prime Minister of Imperial Japan (1885-1888, 1892-1896, 1898, 1900-1901), known as ‘the Father of the Japanese Constitution’ having drafted the 1890 Meiji Constitution of the Imperial Japan
 Jomo Kenyatta, considered the "Founding Father" of Kenya, first Prime Minister then President of Kenya (1963-1978)
 Benedicto Kiwanuka (LLB, 1956), Chief Minister of the Uganda Protectorate then first Prime Minister of Uganda (1961-1962)
 Junichiro Koizumi (小泉 純一郎) (Economics, 1969), former Prime Minister of Japan (2001-2006)
 Sir Charles Lilley (Law), Premier of Queensland (1868-1870)
 Kwame Nkrumah (Philosophy), considered "The Father of African Nationalism", first Prime Minister of the Gold Coast, then first Prime Minister and then first President of Ghana (1952-1966)
 Sir Seewoosagur Ramgoolam, considered the "Founding Father" of Mauritius, Chief Minister of British Mauritius, then first Prime Minister (1961-1982) and then Governor-General of Mauritius (1983–1985)
Baroness Patricia Scotland (LLB), current Secretary General of the Commonwealth of Nations (2016-) and former Attorney General of England and Wales (2007-2010)
 Sir Bernard St. John, former Prime Minister of Barbados (1985-1986)
 Tingfang Wu (伍廷芳), also Ng Choy (伍才), one of the first Premiers of the Republic of China (1917)

Other politicians and public officials
 William Kwasi Aboah (LLM), Ghanaian politician and former Interior Minister
 Kwame Addo-Kufuor (Medicine), former Minister for the Interior and Minister for Defence of Ghana
 Sir Ryland Adkins (BA), former UK Liberal Party politician
 Solomon Adler (Economics), identified Soviet spy and economist at the US Treasury Department
 Richard Alexander (LLB), former UK Conservative Party politician
 Ghazi Abdul Rahman Algosaibi (غازي بن عبدالرحمن القصيبي) (PhD Law, 1970), former Saudi Arabian Ambassador to Great Britain and Minister for Labor
 Sir Alex Allan (MSc Statistics, 1973), former Chairman of the UK Joint Intelligence Committee
 Heidi Allen (Astrophysics), UK Conservative Party politician
 Baroness Ros Altmann (Economics and later lecturer), UK pensions expert and former government minister
 Peter Archer (LLB), former UK Labour Party politician and Solicitor General for England and Wales
 Edward Aveling (BSc Zoology, 1870), prominent UK socialist and founding member of the UK Socialist League and Independent Labour Party
 Barbara Ayrton-Gould, former UK Labour Party politician
 Baey Yam Keng (MSc, Economic Development Board scholarship), Singaporean People's Action Party politician
 Alan Baker (אלן בייקר) (LLB, 1969), international law expert and former Israeli Ambassador to Canada
 Robin Baker (BA), former Deputy Director-General of The British Council and Vice-Chancellor of Canterbury Christ Church University
 Millie Banerjee (BSc Zoology), public official and current Chairman of the British Transport Police Authority
 Sir Thomas Barclay, former UK Liberal Party politician, economic and international law expert and head of the British Chamber of Commerce
 Sir William Barton, former British government official and diplomat of the Indian Political Service
 Evangelos Bassiakos (LLM), former Greek politician who served as government minister and MP of New Democracy
 James Berry (LLB), UK Conservative Party politician
 Baroness Jane Bonham-Carter, UK Liberal Democrat Party politician
 John Albert Bright (BSc, 1867), former Liberal Unionist Party and UK Liberal Party politician
 Lord Richard Briginshaw (Diploma), former General Secretary of NATSOPA and trade unionist
 Rudranath Capildeo (BSc, MSc, PhD Mathematical Physics, 1948, and later lecturer), former Leader of the Opposition in the Parliament of Trinidad and Tobago and leader of the Democratic Labour Party of Trinidad and Tobago
 Tao-fan Chang (張道藩) (Fine Art), former President of the Legislative Yuan of the Republic of China
 Tien-Hsi Cheng (鄭天錫) (LLB, LLD, 1915), former Chinese politician, World Court judge and the last Ambassador of the Republic of China to the UK before the creation of the People's Republic of China. He was the first Chinese student to gain a doctorate in law from a British university.
 Thérèse Coffey (BSc, PhD Chemistry), UK Conservative Party politician and UK Deputy Prime Minister
 Arthur Cohen, former UK Liberal Party politician and barrister
 Sir Arthur Colegate, former UK Conservative Party politician
 Petrus "Papo" Compton (LLM), former Minister of Foreign and External Affairs of Saint Lucia
 Edward Rider Cook (Chemistry), former UK Liberal Party politician
 Sir Daniel Cooper, 1st Baronet, first Speaker of the New South Wales Legislative Assembly and first President of the Royal Philatelic Society London
 Freda Corbet, former UK Labour Party politician
 George Courtauld, former UK Conservative Party politician
 Sir Stafford Cripps (Chemistry), former UK Chancellor of the Exchequer
 Charles Crompton, former UK Liberal Party politician and barrister
 Valerie Davey (PGCE, 1963), former UK Labour Party politician
 Bryan Davies (BA History, PGCE, 1962), UK Labour Party politician
 Geoffrey Dear (LLB, 1962), former Her Majesty's Chief Inspector of Constabulary for England and Wales
 Baroness Frances D'Souza (BSc Anthropology, 1970), second Lord Speaker of the UK House of Lords and scientist
 Evan Durbin (Economics, Ricardo Scholarship, 1930?), former UK Labour Party politician
 Kinsuke Endō (遠藤 謹助) (one of the "Chōshū Five"), regarded as 'the Father of the modern Japanese mint’ as former head of the Imperial Japanese Mint
 Baroness Shreela Flather, first Asian women member of the UK House of Lords 
 Vincent Floissac (LLB), former President of the Saint Lucian Senate
 Mahatma Gandhi ( મોહનદાસ કરમચંદ ) (Law), preeminent leader of the Indian Independence Movement
 Lord Peter Goldsmith (LLM), former Attorney General for England and Wales and Northern Ireland
 Lord Arnold Goodman (LLB), former lawyer, former Chairman of the Arts Council of Great Britain and political advisor to politicians including Harold Wilson
 Rupert Harrison, former Chief of Staff to UK Chancellor of the Exchequer George Osborne (2006-2015)
 Lord Garry Hart, former Special Adviser to the UK Lord Chancellor
 Lord Farrer Herschell (BA, 1857), former UK Lord Chancellor
 Lin Homer (LLB), former Chief Executive of UK HM Revenue and Customs
 Bola Ige (LLB, 1959), former Attorney General and Minister of Justice of Nigeria (2000–2001)
 Annuar Musa, former Minister of Youth and Sport of Malaysia (1990–1993), former Minister of Rural Development (1993–1999), former Minister of Federal Territories (2020–2021), Minister of Communications and Multimedia (2021–)
 Khairy Jamaluddin (MA Legal and Political Theory, 1998), former Minister of Youth and Sport of Malaysia (2013-2018), former Minister of Science, Technology & Innovation (2020-2021), Minister of Health (2021-)
 "J.B." Jeyaretnam (LLB), former leader of the Workers' Party of Singapore and Secretary-General of the Reform Party
 David Jones (LLB), UK Conservative Party politician and government minister. Former Secretary of State for Wales
 Helen Jones (BA), UK Labour Party politician
 Kaoru Inoue (井上 馨) (one of the "Chōshū Five"), first Foreign Minister of Imperial Japan credited as ‘the Father of modern Japanese diplomacy'
 Masaru Inoue (井上 勝) (Civil engineering and mining, as one of the "Chōshū Five"), credited as 'the Father of the Japanese railway' having been the first Director of the Railway Board of Imperial Japan
 Prince Philip Karađorđević of Yugoslavia and Serbia (BA)
 James Kitson (Chemistry and Natural Sciences), former President of the UK Liberal Party and first Lord Mayor of Leeds
 Sylvia Lim (LLM, 1989), chairman of the Workers' Party of Singapore
 Ian Luder (BA Economics and Economic History), UK tax expert and former Lord Mayor of the City of London
 Sir Nicholas Macpherson, Permanent Secretary to the UK Treasury
 Stavros Malas (BSc, PhD Genetics), former Minister of Health of Cyprus and Progressive Party of Working People (AKEL) politician
 Augustus Margary, former UK diplomat, and whose murder caused the 1875 "Margary Affair"
 Brian Mawhinney (PhD Radiation Physics, 1969), former Chairman of the UK Conservative Party and Secretary of State for Transport
 Alison McGovern (Philosophy), UK Labour Party politician
 Fiona Mactaggart (PGCE), UK Labour Party politician and former government minister
 Steve Matenje, Malawian civil servant and Permanent Representative to the United Nations
 Lord Tom McNally (LLB), Liberal Democrat Party politician and former Deputy Leader of the UK House of Lords. He was President of the University College London Union
 Sir William Meyer, first High Commissioner of India to the United Kingdom (1920-1922)
 Amanda Milling (Economics and Statistics, 1997), UK Conservative Party politician
 Edwin Montagu, former UK Secretary of State for India, Minister of Munitions and Chancellor of the Duchy of Lancaster
 Anil Moonesinghe (LLB), Sri Lankan government minister and Trotskyist politician
 Baroness Sally Morgan (MA Education), UK Labour Party politician and former Chair of Ofsted
 Arinori Mori (森有礼), first Japanese Ambassador to the USA and founder of Japan's modern educational system as Minister of Education
 Lord Paul Myners (BA Education, PGCE), UK businessman and former Financial Secretary to the Treasury ("City Minister")
 Stan Newens, UK Labour Co-operative politician and chair of the European Parliamentary Labour Party
 Jesse Norman (MPhil, PhD Philosophy, 2003, and later lecturer), UK Conservative Party politician and government minister
 Harry Nkumbula (Diploma), Northern Rhodesian/Zambian nationalist leader
 John Olumba (Law), American Independent Democratic politician and Member of the Michigan House of Representatives 
 Stephen Owen (LLM, 1974), Minister of Western Economic Diversification of Canada and Minister of State for Sport
 Aziz Pahad (Diploma in International Relations, 1966), South African ANC Party politician and former Deputy Minister of Foreign Affairs (1999-2008)
 Michael Palmer (LLB, 1992), former Speaker of the Parliament of Singapore
 Sir Walter Palmer, former UK Conservative Party politician and biscuit manufacturer
 Pambos Papageorgiou (PhD Political Philosophy), AKEL Party of Cyprus politician
 Michalis Papapetrou, Cypriot politician and former President of the United Democrat Party of Cyprus
 Muhammad Ali Pate, former Minister of State for Health of Nigeria (2011-2013) and now Professor at Duke University's Global Health Institute
 Andrew Pattulo, Canadian former Ontario Liberal Party politician Member of the Legislative Assembly of Ontario
 Bernard Peiris (LLB), former Cabinet Secretary of Ceylon, who drafted the 'Ceylon Order in Council', the first constitution of independent Ceylon
 Colin Phipps (BSc Geology, 1955), former UK Labour Party and UK Social Democratic Party politician
 Thomas Bayley Potter, former UK Liberal Party politician
 Sir Robert John Price (Medicine, 1876), former UK Liberal Party politician
 William Edwin Price (BA, 1959), former UK Liberal Party politician
 Murad Qureshi (MSc Environmental Economics), UK Labour Party politician and former Member of the London Assembly
 Yasmin Qureshi (LLM), UK Labour Party politician
 Sir John Randall (Serbo-Croat Language and Literature, 1979), former Government Deputy Chief Whip of the House of Commons
 Kulveer Ranger (Architecture, 1996), former advisor, Director of Transport Policy and then Environment for the Mayor of London Boris Johnson
 Baroness Patricia Rawlings, UK Conservative Party politician
 Andrew Reid (LLB), lawyer, horse racing trainer and current treasurer of the UK Independence Party
 Winston Roddick (LLB), current Police and Crime Commissioner for North Wales Police (2012-)
 Sir William Rose, former UK Conservative Party politician and Lord Mayor of London (1862)
 Christos Rozakis (LLM, 1970), former Deputy Foreign Minister of Greece, President of the Administrative Tribunal of the Council of Europe and first Vice-President of the European Court of Human Rights
 Sir Sydney Russell-Wells (BSc, 1889), former UK Conservative Party politician and Vice-Chancellor of the University of London
 James Rutherford, former Canadian Liberal Party politician
 Sir John Salmond (LLB, Gilchrist scholarship), former Solicitor-General of New Zealand (1910-1920). He represented New Zealand at the Washington Naval Conference (1921-1922).
 Sir Ernest Satow, former British Ambassador to Japan and British Ambassador to China, the UCL Chair of Japanese Law is named after him
 John Edward Sears (Architecture), former UK Liberal Party politician and architect
 Navin Shah, UK Labour Party politician and Member of the London Assembly
 Tulip Siddiq (BA English Literature), UK Labour Party politician
 Sarup Singh (PhD English Literature, 1953), former Governor of Gujarat (1990-1995) and Governor of Kerala (1990)
 Henry Smith (Philosophy), UK Conservative Party politician
 Sir Arthur Snelling, former UK Ambassador to South Africa (1970-1973) and UK High Commissioner to Ghana (1959-1961)
 Anthony Steen (LLB), UK Conservative Party politician
 Lord William Strang, former Permanent Under-Secretary of State at the UK Foreign Office (1949-1953) and diplomat. He sat on the UCL college committee.
 F.W. Strange (Medicine), former Canadian Liberal-Conservative Party politician
 Sir Dudley Stewart-Smith (LLB), former UK Liberal Party politician and barrister
 Colin Sutton (LLB, 1970), former Assistant Commissioner (Personnel and Training) of the London Metropolitan Police (1987-1988) and Director of the Police Scientific Development Branch at the UK Home Office (1991-1993)
 Sir Charles Swann, former UK Liberal Party politician
 Manuela Sykes, former UK Liberal Party, Labour Party politician and dementia campaigner
 Ernest Symons, former Director-General of the Board of the UK Inland Revenue
 William Ngartse Thomas Tam (LLB, 1923), former member of the Legislative Council of Hong Kong and judge
 Sarah Teather (PhD, did not graduate), UK Liberal Democrat Party politician and former Minister of State for Children and Families (2010-2012)
 Tan Boon Teik (LLB, LLM, 1953), former Attorney-General of Singapore (1967-1992)
 Munenori Terashima (寺島宗則), former Imperial Japanese diplomat
 Stephen Terrell, former President of the UK Liberal Party (1971-1972)
 Baroness Jenny Tonge (MB BS, 1964), independent (former UK Liberal Democrat Party) politician
 Lord Denis Tunnicliffe (BSc Mathematics, 1965), UK Labour Party politician and Opposition Deputy Chief Whip in House of Lords
 Apostolos Tzitzikostas (Public Policy and Economics), Greek politician and Governor of Central Macedonia (2013-)
 Jan Vincent-Rostowski (BSc, MA Economy and History, 1964), Polish politician, former Deputy Prime Minister of Poland and Finance Minister
 V. Viswanathan, Governor of Kerala, India (1967-1973)
 Makis Voridis (Μαυρουδής (Μάκης) Χρήστου Βορίδης) (LLM), Greek politician and former Minister for Health
 William Wedgwood-Benn, Viscount Stansgate, former UK Secretary of State for India and Secretary of State for Air
 George Hammond Whalley (Metaphysics and Rhetoric), former UK Liberal Party politician
 John Whittingdale (Economics, 1982), UK Conservative Party politician and former UK Secretary of State for Culture, Media and Sport
 Lord Michael Williams (BSc, 1971), former United Nations Special Coordinator for Lebanon and UN Special Coordinator for the Middle East Peace Process
 Henry Wilson-Fox, former UK Conservative Party politician, businessman and associate of Cecil Rhodes
 Henry Winterbotham (BA, LLB, 1959, Hume Scholar and University Law Scholar), former UK Liberal Party politician and Under-Secretary of State for the Home Department
 Thomas McKinnon Wood, former UK Liberal Party politician, Secretary for Scotland and Chancellor of the Duchy of Lancaster
 Sidney Woolf, former UK Liberal Party politician
 Iain Wright (BA, MA History, 1995), UK Labour Party politician and former government minister
 Durmuş Yılmaz (MA), Turkish Nationalist Movement Party politician and former Governor of the Central Bank of Turkey (2006-2011)
 Lord David Young (LLB), former UK Secretary of State for Trade and Industry and Secretary of State for Employment. He was Chairman of the UCL Council from 1995 to 2005.
 Yamao Yōzō (尾 庸三)  (Science and industry, as one of the "Chōshū Five"), former Imperial Japanese government minister credited as 'the Father of Japanese engineering'
 Nadhim Zahawi (BSc Chemical Engineering), UK Conservative Party politician and former UK Chancellor of the Exchequer

Explorers 
 Pen Hadow – British polar explorer and author

Royalty 
 Tengku Muhammad Fa-iz Petra (PhD History) - Current Crown Prince of Kelantan, one of the Crown Princes of Malaysia, as a federal constitutional monarchy

Lawyers and judges

Literary figures and authors 

 Gabriela Aguileta (PhD Genetics), author and scientist
 Karim Alrawi, playwright and writer
 M. R. Anand, writer and pioneer of the English novel in India
 Kofi Awoonor (MA), Ghanaian poet, academic and politician
 Julian Baggini (PhD Philosophy, 1996), philosopher and author
 Antonia Barber, author of books for children and adults
 Pat Barr (writer)
 Raymond Briggs
 Robert Browning
 G. K. Chesterton
 Paul Cornell (did not graduate)
 Bernard Cornwell (BA History, 1966), author of historical fiction
 David Crystal
 Nigel Davies (PhD Archaeology), historian of pre-Columbian America and former UK Conservative Party politician
 Romesh Chunder Dutt (রমেশচন্দ্র দত্ত)) (later Professor of Indian History), Indian civil servant and writer who translated the Ramayana and Mahabharata. He also served as President of the Indian National Congress (1899).
 Sir Geoffrey Elton (PhD History, 1949), prominent political historian of the Tudor period
 Ken Follett
 Clare Francis
 Stella Gibbons
 David Irving (Political Economy), Holocaust denier and author
 Laila Lalami
 David Lodge, author
 Dimitris Lyacos 
 David Magarshack, biographer and translator of Russian authors
 Jon de Burgh Miller
 Jonathan Miller
 Gladys Mitchell
 Bel Mooney
 Blake Morrison
 Ian Mortimer (MA), historian and historical fiction author
 Jim Smith, writer
 Michael Smith, author of The Giro Playboy etc.
 Natsume Sōseki (夏目 漱石), foremost Japanese novelist of the Meiji Era (1868–1912)
 Marie Stopes, writer, scientist and activist
 Rabindranath Tagore (Law, did not graduate), Bengali poet and polymath. He was the first non-European to win the Nobel Prize in Literature (1913).
Sean Thomas journalist and novelist
 Ken Wiwa
 Jerrold Yam, Singaporean poet and lawyer

Film, television, theatre and radio 

 Sir Ken Adam (Architecture), Academy Award-winning film production designer famous for designing the sets for various James Bond films (including the first Dr. No) and the famous car for the film Chitty Chitty Bang Bang
 Jassa Ahluwalia (Spanish and Russian), actor
 Babar Ahmed, film director
 Franny Armstrong (Zoology), documentary film director
 Ikenna Azuike (LLB with French Law), TV broadcaster and presenter of What’s Up Africa
 David Baddiel, comedian and television presenter
 Guy de la Bédoyère (MA Archaeology, 1987), historian, TV personality and Time Team historical expert
 Brooke Burfitt, actress and radio presenter
 George Clarke (Postgraduate Diploma), architect and TV presenter of shows including George Clarke's Amazing Spaces
 Nat Coombs, presenter, writer & comedian
 Andrew Davenport, co-creator of the Teletubbies
 Andrew Davies (BA English, 1957), novelist and screenplay writer. His famous works include Mr Selfridge, House of Cards (UK) and a 1995 adaptation of Pride and Prejudice.
 Ptolemy Dean (Architecture), architect and TV presenter
 Naamua Delaney (LLB), news presenter
 Felix Dexter (LLB), actor and comedian
 Clarissa Dickson-Wright (LLB), celebrity chef, writer and TV personality
 Jonathan Dimbleby, writer and television presenter
 Frank Dunlop, former Director of the Edinburgh International Festival; founder and former Director, The Young Vic. [1979]
 Jane Fallon, English producer and novelist, most famous for her work on popular series Teachers, 20 Things To Do Before You're 30, EastEnders and This Life.
 Trey Farley, television presenter.
 Honey G, Rap music artist, X Factor 2016 Debut
 Ricky Gervais, comedian/actor, co-writer and director of The Office (studied biology and philosophy)
 Peter Ginn, archaeologist, historian, author and presenter of " Victorian Farm", "Edwardian Farm", "Wartime Farm"
 Rachel Hurd-Wood, actress; best known for playing Wendy Darling at the 2003 film Peter Pan
 Amy Jenkins, creator of This Life
 Christian Jessen, medical doctor and television presenter
 Griffith Jones, actor
 James Robertson Justice, actor
 Dominic Keating, actor, including in Star Trek: Enterprise
 Trevor Lock, comedian and actor
 Philip Mackie, film and television writer
 Jeremy Marre, film director
 Steph McGovern, BBC Breakfast television presenter
 Oliver Messel, influential leading stage designer
 Fiona Millar, journalist and campaigner on education and parenting issues
 Karen Mok, Hong Kong diva and movie star
 Michael J. Mosley, psychiatrist and TV presenter
 Maryam Moshiri, BBC newsreader
 Mary Nighy, actress
 Christopher Nolan (English, 1993), Academy Award-nominated director of films including Inception, Interstellar, Memento and The Dark Knight Trilogy
 Sean O'Connor, television and radio producer
 Raj Persaud, psychiatrist and broadcaster
 Mark Porter, doctor, journalist and TV presenter
 Jonathan Ross (Modern European History), TV presenter
 Adam Rutherford, TV presenter and editor for the journal Nature
 Irene Shubik, television producer
 Michael Smith, writer and broadcaster
 Suzie Templeton, Academy Award-winning writer, director and animator, including Peter and the Wolf
 Fagun Thakrar, actor and writer-director
 Emma Thomas (UCL History 1993), producer at Warner Brothers
 Matthew Vaughn (Anthropology and Ancient History), producer and director of films including Lock, Stock and Two Smoking Barrels, Layer Cake X-Men: First Class, and Kingsman: The Secret Service
 Arthur Wimperis, Academy Award-winning screenwriter
 Patrick Wymark, actor
 Alex Zane, presenter, radio DJ and stand-up comedian

Editors, journalists and publishers 
 Fiona Armstrong (German literature), journalist
 Walter Bagehot, former editor of The Economist
 Christopher Paul Baker, travel writer, photographer, and adventure motorcyclist
 Victoria Barnsley, Editor-in-Chief at HarperCollins
 Jeremy Bowen, journalist, BBC Middle East editor
 Sarah Cullen (BA English, 1972), radio and TV journalist
 John Derbyshire, essayist, novelist, popularizer of mathematics history
 Sara Edwards (BA Medieval and Modern History), journalist and former presenter of BBC Wales Today
 Nicholas Garland, first and current political cartoonist, The Daily Telegraph
 A. A. Gill, columnist, The Sunday Times (Slade School of Fine Art)
 Jeanne Hoban, The Ceylon Observer, Jana, The Patriot, The Nation (all Sri Lanka); Anglo-Sri Lankan Trotskyist trade unionist and political activist
 Richard Hutton, former editor of The Economist
 Nicholas de Jongh, drama critic, The London Evening Standard
 Mark Lawson, columnist, The Guardian; radio and television presenter
 Walter Layton, 1st Baron Layton, former editor of The Economist
 Vivienne Parry, journalist, The Times and BBC
 Gabriel Pogrund, Whitehall editor, The Sunday Times
 Nick Paton Walsh, Emmy award-winning Senior International correspondent at CNN
 L. J. K. Setright: writer and journalist
 Carol Thatcher (LLB), journalist, author, media personality and daughter of former UK Prime Minister Margaret Thatcher
 Michael White, political editor, The Guardian
 Petronella Wyatt, writer, The Spectator

Musicians, musicologists and musical commentators 

 Brett Anderson, Suede
 Sophie Barker, singer, occasional vocalist for Zero 7 and Groove Armada (did not graduate)
 Guy Berryman, Coldplay
 Jonny Buckland, Coldplay
 Will Champion, Coldplay
 David Conway (music historian)
 John Curwen, proponent of tonic sol-fa
 Kathleen Dale née Richards, translator, musicologist, composer and pianist (Swedish: 1926–8)
 Zarif Davidson, known professionally as Zarif
 Justine Frischmann, Elastica
 Leonard Feather, jazz musician, composer, and writer (1932)
 Joshua Hayward, The Horrors
 Philip Heseltine aka Peter Warlock, composer and music critic (English)
 Gustav Holst, composer and teacher (Sanskrit, 1909)
 Ravi Kesavaram, My Vitriol
 Chris Martin, Coldplay
 Jack Peñate, singer-songwriter
 Tim Rice-Oxley, Keane
 Harold Rosenthal, music critic
 Som Wardner, My Vitriol
Mary Louisa White, composer
 Benjamin Zander, conductor, Boston Philharmonic
 Charlotte Emma Aitchison (Charli XCX), hyperpop musician

Philanthropists, cultural, educational, military and religious figures
 Barnett Abrahams (BA), former Principal of the London School of Jewish Studies and the first English Jewish minister to hold a British university degree
 Kaniz Ali (LLB, 2007), entrepreneur, makeup artist and columnist
 Sheikh Zaki Badawi (BSc Psychology, 1954), Egyptian Islamic scholar, interfaith-dialogue activist and founder of the Muslim College in London
 Ben Barkow, writer and director of the Wiener Library
 Lynne Brindley, former Chief Executive of the British Library
 George Cassidy (MPhil, 1967), former Bishop of Southwell and Nottingham
 Brian Castle, current Bishop of Tonbridge
 Isaac Cohen, former Chief Rabbi of Ireland
 Altheia Jones-LeCointe, activist and leader of Black Panther Party in the UK in 1960s and 1970s
 Barry Morgan, current Archbishop of Wales
 Hugh Price-Hughes, Methodist theologian
 Lieutenant Colonel Arthur Martin-Leake (Medicine), soldier who received both the Victoria Cross and the Bar
 Lieutenant-General Jonathon Riley (Geography), former Master of the Royal Armouries (2009-2012) and Deputy Commander of the International Security Assistance Force in Afghanistan (2008-2009)
 Jackie Tabick (BA Medieval History), the first British woman Rabbi
 F. Sherwood Taylor (PhD History of Science), former Director of the Science Museum, London (1950-1956)
 Sonia Solicari, Director of the Museum of the Home
 Henry Solly, founder of Working Men's Club and Institute Union; an important advocate for the extension of working class political rights, and helping to set up the Charity Organisation Society
 Samuel Bishop, former Bishop of Kingston (1915-1921) and Canon of St George's Chapel, Windsor Castle (1921-1929)
 Emma Thynn, Viscountess Weymouth

Sporting figures 

 Donald Barrell (Anthropology), rugby union player formerly of Saracens F.C.
 Colin Chapman, founder of Lotus Cars
 Samuel Azu Crabbe (LLB), former Chief Justice of Ghana and President of the National Olympic Committee of Ghana
 Ewan Davies (LLB), former Welsh rugby union international 
 David Gower, cricketer and former England Captain
 Isa Guha, cricketer, England Women's
 Patrick Head, co-founder of Formula One team WilliamsF1
 Christine Ohuruogu, sprinter and World Athletics Championships, Olympic Games and Commonwealth Games 400 metres champion
 Ebony-Jewel Rainford-Brent, cricketer, England Women's
 Gayatri Reddy (BSc Construction Management),  former owner of now-defunct Deccan Chargers in the Indian Premier League
 Nathaniel "Noddy" Reilly-O'Donnell, rower, 2006 World Junior Champion and silver medallist at the 2011 World Rowing Championships
 Peter Short (Master's in International Planning), Canadian international and Olympic field hockey player
 Andrew Simpson (Economics), British Olympic Games Men's Star sailing gold medalist (2008)
 Dawson Turner (Medicine), rugby union international who represented England (1871–75). 
 Demetrius Vikelas (Botany), first President of the International Olympic Committee (1894-1896)
 Maurice Watkins (LLB, LLM), Director of Manchester United's football board and club's solicitor
 Robin Williams, professional rowing coach for Team GB and former competitive World Championships rower
 Melanie Wilson (Master's in Biochemical Engineering), British rower who competed at the 2012 Summer Olympics in Women's quadruple sculls

Fictional figures

Fictional alumni and students 
 Pat Barker's novels, Life Class and Toby's Room, follows students and teachers at the UCL Slade School of Fine Art
 Protagonist/s in Gilbert Cannan's Mendel
 Lara Croft,  protagonist of the Square Enix (previously Eidos Interactive) video game franchise Tomb Raider
 Molly MacDonald in Monarch of the Glen is a former Slade School student

References

External links 
UCL student lists

Lists of people by university or college in London